Lake Sarapococha or Lake Sarapacocha (possibly from Quechua qucha lake),  is a lake in the Huayhuash mountain range in the Andes of Peru. It is located in the Lima Region, Cajatambo Province, Copa District. It lies at the foot of the Sarapo (or Sarapa), south-west of it.

See also
List of lakes in Peru

References

Lakes of Peru
Lakes of Lima Region